In May 1607 one hundred men and young boys were on an expedition that landed them in what is now known as Virginia. They became the first permanent English settles in America. They named the colony of Jamestown after the English King James. The site was chosen precisely for its location and beneficial factors. Jamestown was surrounded by water on three sides of the land; this made it easily accessible for ships to come and go. It was far enough inland which made it easier to defend from a possible Spanish attack. Lastly, the land was not currently being inhabited by the natives. At the time it was said that the men had to be able to create a living before any women could be a part of the colony.

In the early days of the colony, the Powhatan Indians were known for helping the settlers. They would provide food and other supplies to the English settlers. In 1609, the Powhatan tribe could not help the settlers due to a drought, and insufficient amount of supplies to share between their tribe and the settlers. This was known as the starving time in Virginia, most of the settlers had died of starvation and diseases due to the lack of supplies. The essay, A Short History of Jamestown, notes that "As a result they ate anything they could: various animals, leather from their shoes and belts, and sometimes fellow settlers who had already died due to starvation and disease." This illustrates just how desperate for supplies and food the early settlers were.

Women's roles before and after European colonization 
In the early Virginia colonies, Native American women were responsible for both household tasks and hard labor in the fields. It was normal for the Native American women to have more responsibilities than men, as they were viewed as superior to men in certain ways. Powhatan women (the tribe of Pochohontas) did not eat with the men, and the men had many wives Most of the time the men would have to travel for food or trade and leave the women alone for long periods of time. Therefore, women had to be able to cope and live without relying or depending on their husbands to do the heavy lifting. Once European women arrived in the New World the views on what women's roles were conflicted. European women were always expected to do the household tasks, while caring for and teaching their children. In the eyes of European, women were never supposed to step into men's roles. Some European women were also sent into some of the Native American tribes to teach them the way of the English, primarily by teaching the women to weave clothes. as well as their religion, and culture. European wives, whose families were wealthy to own a slave did not have to complete household tasks. However, those who were not wealthy enough to own a slave did not receive any help with the house hold chores.

Why women came to Virginia colonies 
Women were known to provide a sense of stability. They came to the Jamestown Colony to marry men in the colony or to serve as indentured servants. Some women were also known to come to the colony at a young age with their families, such as Cecily Jordan Farrar. In 1610, the colony's focus was on establishing families. Women were married soon after their arrival to the colony, and were then expected to provide children. Women who were single could not own land after 1618, because the Virginia Company felt that if women could uphold land than they would be less likely to marry. This was a problem because early on a woman was expected to marry and produce children to support the growth of the colony. This was a concern, since "Women frequently gave birth to ten or twelve children, but childbirth was very dangerous for women." Until 1654 and the Anthony Johnson v. John Casor case If a woman was of African descent, then she was a part of the indentured servant population, after that case there was a change in legal status and they were slaves. African American women were first brought to Virginia in 1619 three women and 20 men. They were sold into bondage to wealthy Planters like Governor George Yeardley.As time passed African American women forced to work in the fields and do jobs that were known as part of the men's role in American and European society, as well as perform domestic duties. Black women were also seen as a way to produce native born slaves. There was class, race and gender structure in Colonial America. The female indentured servants, did not encounter any conditions different than what they experienced at home in England, from household chores to farming. The role of women was clearly defined. If of the Planter (upper) class, she was expected to supervise the slaves attending to the household, and play a supporting role to the man. The wives of farmers, found life harder, toiling dawn to dusk and beyond, in the house and in the field, but this harder life led to more dependence on and respect for the woman's role.

Women's rights 
In the Early stages of the Virginia colonies, women did not have as many rights as they did in England. Women were not able to take part in many things, such as voting, owning land, or even holding a spot in political office. If a woman was not married, then their fathers held the rights to them until married and were taken into the care of their husband. The only women allowed to escape the control of a man were widows. Even if a widow decided to remarry after her husband's death, she had the right to control her property. To keep control over the property given to her by her deceased husband, a widow would have to make legal arrangements. These arrangements would prevent a future husband from taking over the rights to the land.

Indentured servant 

Twenty African, indentured servants were brought over in a Portuguese ship in 1619 Anyone who was considered an indentured servant before this were white. Blacks were not enslaved until the case of Anthony Johnson v. John Casor in 1654. Being an indentured servant meant that one had to work for a particular time frame to pay for their transportation to the New World. They were also not allowed to be married while being an indentured servant. After they had served their time, the indentured servants were free. In the 1620s, indentured servants became the main contribution to Virginia's economy and society. Servants were a big part of maintaining the economy because without the servants and slaves Virginia would have had major economy problems. The original settlers had a hard time keeping up with all the work that needed to be done. It was common for servants and slaves to become overwhelmed with the work load that some considered running away to live life with the Indians. If a servant or slave were caught running away from their master they could be put to death, but that would be destroying personal property as slaves cost money and produced labor.. In some cases, masters would treat their indentured servants and slaves with respect rather than beating them. This provided a sense of reliability in them and made it more likely they would ask to work for the owner following year to pay that the indenture expired. In 1640, views on race changed for slaves.

. By 1622, African American women were more valuable, since they could work in the fields and in the household. This led the Virginia company to pass a law allowing them to obtain more African American women who could provide a dual workload.

Indentured servants were chattel. The master had no financial investment in them, and after they served their contract they were freed, given clothes, seed and often a plot of land. Slaves on the other hand were property and Masters had a financial investment in them, thus their well-being as they were expected to produce for life and not a term of years.

Women of the Virginia Colonies

Pocahontas (Matoaka) 

Pocahontas was the first woman to help the colonists and become a part of the Jamestown colony. She was the daughter of Wahunsenaca, the chief of the Native Russian tribe, Powhatan. Her mother died while giving birth to her, and Matoaka was later renamed Pocahontas. She was originally kidnapped by the English settlers which caused riots between the Indians and colonists. Pocahontas was viewed as a sex object by the men and held against her will. Her role early on was to bring food to the early settlers of Jamestown. She eventually became educated and was baptized into the English religion. At the time, the religion of the English Church was Protestantism. In 1614, she married an English settler, John Rolfe. Her marriage to Rolfe helped to calm the tension between the English and Native Americans. She later died in England in 1617.

Mistress Forrest 
Mistress Forrest was the first English woman settler who came to Jamestown in 1608. Mistress came alongside her husband Thomas and maid. She was also the first woman in Jamestown to give birth to a child. Mistress and her maid Anne Burris were said to be the only two women of the colony until 1609 when another ship came over. She and her maid were both considered to be a sense of stability for the colony. This was because before they had arrived, the colony was just made up of men and young boys. Without Mistress and Anne, the role of women known to England was not being fulfilled.

Anne Burras 
Anne Burras was Mistress Forrest' maid, who came over with her in 1608. She was first of many willing to take the chance of leaving what she knew to go to the colonies, where her future was unknown. She married a man named John Laydon three months after her arrival. She was only fourteen when she married her twenty- eight-year-old husband. Their wedding was the very first to occur in Jamestown. They had four daughters together and found it hard to stay in Jamestown. They struggled to raise their daughters in Virginia but put up a fight for stabilization. Burras was one of a few who survived through both the Starving Time and the Indian Massacre in 1622.

Temperance Flowerdew 
Temperance Flowerdew came to Jamestown in the fall of 1609 with four hundred ill- fated settlers. It was said that she came over on the Falcon, a convey ship, with others, when they were caught in a storm, which caused some ships to go missing. She survived the illness and sickness of the Starving Time and returned to England. In 1619, she returned to Jamestown married to Governor George Yeardley. Flowerdew became Lady Yeardley when Yeardly became the governor of the colony. Her husband ended up making a treaty, in which he had one thousand acres of land granted in his wife's name. After her husband died Flowerdew married Governor Frances West in 1628. She died a few months later.

Cecily Jordan Farrar
Cecily Jordan Farrar came to Jamestown in 1611, a year after Temperance Flowerdew. Three days after her husband Samuel Jordan died in 1623, Reverend Grivell Pooley claimed to have proposed to her and alleged that she accepted. Later that year, she disavowed Pooley's claim by contracting herself to another suitor, William Farrar in front of the Governor Yeardley and the Council of Virginia. This started the first breach of promise suit in English North America, which was unusual because a woman was the defendant. The case took two years to settle, but Cecily prevailed in the end. Reverend Pooley put up a bond promising to release Cecily from any obligations to him. In the meantime, Cicely became a head of household for the 450-acre family plantation, Jordan's Journey. After the case was settled, she married William Farrar.

Jane Pierce 
Jane came over to Virginia with her mother Joan Pierce on the Blessing in 1609. Both she and her mother managed to survive through the Starving Time of Virginia. Her mother was known as the master of gardening within the colony. Jane grew up learning from her mother. In 1619, she married John Rolfe after Pocahontas had passed away, and had a daughter. Her daughter died in 1635 at the age of 15.

Jane Dickenson 
Jane Dickenson came to Virginia with her husband as indentured servants in 1620. She was sent to a plantation along the James River. During the Indian uprising she was captured and held captive for close to a year. A doctor by the name of Dr. John Pott saved her with a ransom. She became a servant for the Potts family after her rescue and moved to Jamestown. In 1624 she approached the governor and asked for her freedom. She pleaded that her time serving the Potts family was harsher than being captive with the Indians.

Hannah Bennett Turner Tompkins Arnold 
Hannah Bennett Turner Tompkins Arnold was the only surviving child of her parents, and because of this she was able to inherit over four hundred acres of land in the 1630s. Throughout her life, she obtained a large amount of land. While she was married to her first husband he helped her to get the title for her father's land. When he passed away she became a widow and obtained all the land he had in his possession. She went through the same process with her second husband and with her third husband as well. She was one women who became well known and a huge part of the community because she had obtained so much land.

Mary Aggie 
Mary Aggie was a slave to Anne Sullivan, who was a tavern owner in Williamsburg, Virginia. Mary tried to sue Anne for freedom in 1728, but the judge did not agree and did not give her freedom. Mary tried to show the judge her belief and faith in the Christian religion to appeal to the judge. This helped her later, when she was charged of stealing from her owner in 1730. She was carefully watched until she was caught stealing three sheets from her "owner" that were worth forty shillings. During this time if you were convicted of stealing the punishment was usually death or severe corporal punishment. Yet, for Mary, it was not. She convinced the judge that she was a faithful Christian, so he said she qualified for clergy. This meant that because it was her first offense, she didn't get any charges. Her case went on for months and, in May 1731, she was forced out of the colony and sold as a slave to another colony. However, because she tried to fight the case and for her rights, she became a part of history and all Virginians received the right to plead clergy on their first conviction, no matter what their race or gender was.

Christina Campbell 
Christina Campbell was raised in the Williamsburg Virginia colony. After her husband died in 1752, she was left a widow who had to support her two daughters. To help support her family she opened and ran her own tavern. Her tavern was run successfully for more than twenty years. It was said that her father John Burdett was a tavern owner and her parents taught her the skills needed to run a tavern. Christina was also a slave owner, which helped her maintain the workload at the tavern and at home. She also sent her slave children to a school for African American children who were either free or enslaved. Not many slave owners were willing to do this, as most slave owners were harsh towards their slaves.

Mary Draper Ingles 

Mary Draper Ingles was an early settler of western Virginia. In the summer of 1755, she and her two young sons were among several captives taken by Shawnee warriors after the Draper's Meadow Massacre during the French and Indian War. They were taken to Lower Shawneetown at the confluence of the Ohio and Scioto rivers. After two and a half months, Ingles escaped with another woman and trekked 500 to 600 miles, averaging between eleven and twenty-one miles a day, crossing at least 145 rivers and creeks and the Appalachian Mountains to return to her home in what is now Blacksburg, Virginia. Forty-two days after her escape, she reached the home of her friend Adam Harman on 1 December 1755. Mary and her husband later established the Ingles Ferry across the New River, and the associated Ingles Ferry Hill Tavern and blacksmith shop. She died there in 1815, aged 83.

References

History of women in the United States
Colony of Virginia
American frontier
17th-century American women
18th-century American women